The Martinique women's national football team represents the French internationally and region of Martinique in international football. The team is controlled by the Ligue de football de la Martinique, a local branch of French Football Federation.

As an overseas department of the French Republic, Martinique is not a member of FIFA and is therefore not eligible to enter the FIFA Women's World Cup or any competition organized first-hand by the organization. Martiniquais, being French citizens, are eligible to play for the France women's national football team. Martinique is, however, a member of CONCACAF and CFU and is eligible for all competitions organized by both organizations. According to the status of the FFF (article 34, paragraph 6): "[...]Under the control of related continental confederations, and with the agreement of the FFF, those leagues can organize international sport events at a regional level or set up teams in order to participate to them." A special rule of the CONCACAF Gold Cup only allows players to join the team if they have not played for France during the past five years. On the other side, any player joining Martinique is allowed to join the France national team after-wards without any time limit.

CONCACAF W Championship record

*Draws include knockout matches decided on penalty kicks.

Current squad
Roster for the 2014 CONCACAF Women's Championship.

Head coach: Charlaine Marie Jeanne

References

External links
 Official site
 National Football Teams page

Caribbean women's national association football teams
women